Allium carinatum, the keeled garlic or witch's garlic, is a bulbous perennial flowering plant in the family Amaryllidaceae. It is widespread across central and southern Europe, with some populations in Asiatic Turkey. It is cultivated in many places as an ornamental and also for its potently aromatic bulbs used as a food flavoring.

Varieties 
Numerous botanical names have been coined within the species at the varietal level, but only two are recognized:
Allium carinatum subsp. carinatum -  most of species range
Allium carinatum subsp. pulchellum (G.Don) Bonnier & Layens - central Europe + Balkans

Description
Allium carinatum produces a single small bulb rarely more than 15 mm long, flat leaves, and an umbel up to 60 cm tall of purple to reddish-purple flowers. The flowers are on long pedicels and often nodding (hanging downwards).

Distribution
Allium carinatum is considered native to the Mediterranean Region from Spain to Turkey, north to Sweden and the Baltic Republics. It is naturalized in the British Isles

Cultivation
A. carinatum subsp. pulchellum 
and the white flowering form A. carinatum subsp. pulchellum f. album 
have both gained the Royal Horticultural Society’s Award of Garden Merit.

References

carinatum
Garlic
Flora of Europe
Flora of Turkey
Edible plants
Garden plants
Plants described in 1753
Taxa named by Carl Linnaeus
Taxobox binomials not recognized by IUCN